Japanese Story is a 2003 Australian romantic drama film directed by Sue Brooks. It was screened in the Un Certain Regard section at the 2003 Cannes Film Festival.

Plot

Sandy Edwards (played by Toni Collette) is a director in a company that designs geological software in Perth, Western Australia. Her business partner manipulates her into agreeing to act as a guide for a Japanese businessman visiting mines in the Pilbara desert, in hopes that he will purchase the software. When Hiromitsu Tachibana arrives, he treats Sandy like a chauffeur, and he seems more intent on self-discovery in the wilderness than on buying computer software. At first, Sandy is angered by his reserved, demanding demeanor. On their first journey into the desert, Hiromitsu, feeling insecure, talks more on his phone with friends in Japan than he does to Sandy. He also insists that she drive farther than planned. The terrain proves too much for the pair's vehicle, which becomes bogged down in the sand. After a series of desperate attempts to release the vehicle, including digging a dead man anchor, their winch burns out. Sandy wants to use Hiromitsu's phone to call people who can rescue them, but Hiromitsu refuses. This forces them to spend the night stranded together. The next day, Hiromitsu, conscious that his refusal had placed them in danger, wakes up much earlier than Sandy and builds a track of sticks over which they can drive out of the sand. The manoeuvre is successful. Now that they are on the road again, the ice breaks and a friendship starts between them that, in isolated surroundings uninterrupted by their work, grows quickly and honestly. Later, at a motel, they have sex. Only after does Sandy learn that Hiromitsu has a wife and children in Japan.

On another journey to scenic spots, Hiromitsu and Sandy share a quiet moment and kiss each other, eventually having sex again. Afterwards, Sandy runs into a swimming hole nearby. Hiromitsu follows her, diving into the shallow water before she can warn him, and disappears. Sandy frantically calls for him and, after a moment, his lifeless body resurfaces. In shock at his sudden death, Sandy struggles to deal with the situation, dragging his body into their vehicle and carefully washing it before driving for hours to the nearest town. Back in Perth, Sandy cannot comprehend the violent end to her journey. Reality intrudes in the form of Hiromitsu's grieving widow, Yukiko, and Sandy tries to understand how Hiromitsu's life had ended before she had understood his place in hers.

Cast
 Toni Collette – Sandy Edwards
  (綱島郷太郎 Tsunashima Gōtarō) – Hiromitsu Tachibana
 Matthew Dyktynski – Bill Baird
 Lynette Curran – Mum
 Yumiko Tanaka (田中由美子 Tanaka Yumiko) – Yukiko Tachibana
 Kate Atkinson – Jackie
 Bill Young – Jimmy Smithers
 Reg Evans – Bloke in Row Boat
 George Shevtsov – James
 Justine Clarke – Jane
 Igor Sas – Fraser
 Mike Frencham – Blake
 John Howard – Richards
 Phil Bennett – Barman
 Heath Bergersen – Petrol Bloke
 Peter Heather - Police Officer 1
 Ray Curren - Police Officer 2
 Peter Lester - Chef

Box office
Japanese Story grossed $4,520,000 at the box office in Australia.

Reception and accolades
Japanese Story received mixed to positive reviews, currently holding an approval rating of 68% on Rotten Tomatoes.

See also

 Cinema of Australia

References

External links

Official website - Palace Films
Japanese Story at the National Film and Sound Archive

2003 films
APRA Award winners
Australian adventure drama films
2000s adventure drama films
2003 romantic drama films
Australian romantic drama films
2000s Japanese-language films
Films set in Western Australia
Films directed by Sue Brooks
Japan in non-Japanese culture
2000s English-language films